Benivar-e Olya (also Romanized as Benīvār-e ‘Olyā;  and also known as Benvār, Benvār-e Bālā, Benvār-e ‘Olyā, Bonvār-e Bālā, Bonvār-e ‘Olyā, Bonvar-e ‘Olyā, and Buniwar) is a village in Jarahi Rural District, in the Central District of Mahshahr County, Khuzestan Province, Iran. At the 2006 census, its population was 109, in 23 families.

References 

Populated places in Mahshahr County